The Mission Party was an Armenian political party founded on 2 February 2013. In August 2021, the party announced its decision to merge with the Country of Living Party.

History
Its debut was at the 2013 Yerevan City Council election, where the party came in last place with less than 1% of the vote.

In the 2017 Armenian parliamentary election, the party participated as part of the Tsarukyan Alliance. The alliance won 31 seats in the National Assembly.

In the 2018 Yerevan City Council elections, the party joined Civil Contract and formed the My Step Alliance, which won the elections, and their candidate Hayk Marutyan became the Mayor of Yerevan. The My Step Alliance took part in the 2018 Armenian parliamentary elections and won a supermajority of seats within the National Assembly.

Prior to the 2021 Armenian parliamentary elections, Civil Contract announced that they would be participating in the elections independently, effectively dissolving the My Step Alliance. Meanwhile, the Mission Party did not register to participate in the 2021 elections. In August 2021, the party merged with the Country of Living Party.

Ideology 
During the party formation, leaders made clear that the party would not be explicitly Pro-Russian or Pro-Western but rather the party will focus on advocating the values of freedom and democracy in Armenia.

Electoral record

Parliamentary elections

Local elections

Yerevan City Council elections

See also
 Programs of political parties in Armenia

References

External links
Mission Party on Facebook

2013 establishments in Armenia
Political parties in Armenia
Centrist parties in Europe
Political parties established in 2013
Political parties disestablished in 2021
Liberal parties in Armenia